Xylanimonas pachnodae is a bacterium from the genus Xylanimonas which has been isolated from the hindgut of the larvae of Pachnoda marginata in the Netherlands.

References

External links
Type strain of Xylanimicrobium pachnodae at BacDive -  the Bacterial Diversity Metadatabase

Micrococcales
Bacteria described in 2004